The 9×18mm Ultra is a German pistol cartridge.  It was originally developed in 1936 for use by the Luftwaffe, but was not adopted at that time.

Description
In the 1972–1973 time frame, Walther introduced the Walther PP Super, chambered in 9×18mm Ultra for the West German Police.  It might have been influenced by the success of the Soviet 9×18mm Makarov, although most observed the opposite (the Ultra cartridge is usually agreed to have been the design basis for the Makarov, with similar case length and a slightly wider and shorter projectile). It is often interpreted as an intermediate round between 9×17mm and 9×19mm Parabellum, fit for simple blowback pistols. However, as actually loaded, the cartridge's working pressure and velocities are much closer to those of .380 ACP than to 9x19mm.

The Walther PP Super was discontinued in 1979. The cartridge was made available to the civilian market in 1975, but did not gain lasting popularity.

In addition to the Walther PP Super, the SIG Sauer P230, Mauser HSc-80, and Benelli B76 were also produced in 9×18mm Ultra. 

The 9×18mm Ultra (.355-inch caliber) is not interchangeable with the 9×18mm Makarov (.365-inch caliber), which uses a larger-diameter bullet.

References

 
Pistol and rifle cartridges
Military cartridges
Weapons and ammunition introduced in 1936